Chungbuk Cheongju FC (Korean: 충북 청주 FC), formerly Cheongju FC (Korean: 청주 FC), is a South Korean football club based in the city of Cheongju that competes in the K League 2, the second tier of South Korean football. The club was founded in 2002 and play their home games at the Cheongju Sports Complex.

History
The club was founded in 2002 as Cheongju Solveig Football Club, and competed at amateur level.
 
In the 2009 season, the club joined the K3 League after changing its name to Cheongju Jikji FC. Before the 2019 season, the club merged with Cheongju City FC.

In 2022, Cheongju FC announced that they would join the professional K League 2 in the 2023 season, and also renamed as Chungbuk Cheongju FC.

Squad

Season-by-season records

References

External links
Official website 

K3 League clubs
K3 League (2007–2019) clubs
K League 2 clubs
Association football clubs established in 2002
2002 establishments in South Korea
Sport in North Chungcheong Province
Cheongju